This is a partial list of 20th-century writers. This list includes notable artists, authors, philosophers, playwrights, poets, scientists and other important and noteworthy contributors to literature. The two most basic written literary categories include fiction and non fiction.

A

B

C

D

E

F

G

H

I-J

K

L

M

N-O

P-Q

R

S

T

U-W

X-Z

See also

20th-century writers
Writers